Jolgeh-ye Musaabad Rural District is a rural district (dehestan) in the Central District of Torbat-e Jam County, Razavi Khorasan Province, Iran. At the 2006 census, its population was 7,728, in 1,661 families.  The rural district has 17 villages.

References 

Rural Districts of Razavi Khorasan Province
Torbat-e Jam County